That Game of Chess is a 2009 American drama film directed by Raja Bundela, starring Viresh Sinha, Melanie Malia, Alok Nath and Cazzy Golomb.

Cast
 Viresh Sinha as Rahul
 Melanie Malia as Sarah
 Alok Nath as Father
 Cazzy Golomb as Elena
 Raja Bundela as Raj Bedi
 Spencer Scott as Tony

Release
The film was released on 3 April 2009.

Reception
Gary Goldstein of the Los Angeles Times wrote that the film is "so unconvincingly played and poorly crafted that it's checkmate from the first move."

David Chute of LA Weekly wrote that "the film displays no zest or inventiveness whatsoever, though the actors manage, most of the time, to read their dialog audibly."

Mark Keizer of Boxoffice rated the film 0.5 stars out of 5 and wrote that the film is "just too silly for any serious discussion other than how Sinha plans to live now that’s blown his life savings on a movie this bad."

References

External links
 
 

American drama films
2009 drama films